Laurel Grove, Virginia may refer to:
Laurel Grove, Pittsylvania County, Virginia
Laurel Grove, Westmoreland County, Virginia